Mathieu Jean Felicité de Montmorency, duc de Montmorency-Laval (10 July 1767 – 24 March 1826) was a French statesman during the French Revolution and Bourbon Restoration. He was elected as the youngest member of the National Assembly in 1789. He is also known for his military expertise and his relation with Mme de Staël. When France became a republic Montmorency turned into an ultra-royalist. Napoleon regarded him as a member of the Catholic opposition. During the restoration he became Minister of Foreign Affairs.

Early years
Mathieu de Montomorency was born in Paris, France on 10 July 1767. He was the son of Mathieu Paul Louis de Montmorency, vicomte de Laval (1748–1809) and Catherine Jeanne Tavernier de Boullongne (d. 1838). Montmorency's father was a scion of one of the oldest noble families in France, while his wife was the daughter of an aristocratic French planter in Guadeloupe. Montmorency went on to seek higher education at College du Plessis, where he developed his love for the subject of philosophy and the idea of enlightenment.

In 1780, his father, a colonel of the Auvergne regiment, was appointed a premier gentilhomme de la chambre to King Louis XVI of France's younger brother, the Comte de Provence. However, when Catherine was denied the corresponding rank of dame pour accompagner to the prince's wife, Marie-Joséphine, due to her relatively low birth, Laval resigned his post in Provence's household. Montmorency was a very intelligent man. He was a diplomatist and a great writer. He eventually went to become a tutor for Henry, duke de Bordeaux, the grandson of Charles X.

In 1788 Mathieu de Montmorency married his first cousin Hortense de Luynes. Despite being married he actually paid very little attention to his wife. Due to the very relaxed nature of marriages, he often was seen without his wife. In actuality, Montmorency was madly in love with another cousin by the name of Marquise de Laval. When Laval died in Summer 1790, Montmorency went to a great depression. Madame de Stael brought Montmorency out of his depression since writing a series of letters to each other.

Career
Originally known by the title of Comte de Montmorency-Laval, Mathieu served as an adolescent with his father in the American War of Independence with Lafayette. America was a new nation that had built its nation on democracy and liberty. Montmorency is credited for bringing these new governmental ideas to France. He became the governor of the city and castle of Compiègne.

Montmorency was a member of the noble class. The nobility had a very negative reputation, as they were known for being greedy and discourteous. However, Montmorency's actions began to change the way the nobility was viewed at the start of the revolution. He was extremely generous and showed great remorse to people, unlike others. His ultimate goal was to make the French people happy, while still preserving the nobility.

He was the deputy of Montfort-l'Amaury from 28 March 1789 til 30 September 1791. He joined the Estates General (France) as its youngest member. He moved to the left side of the National Assembly, shifting from the Second Estate, the nobility.  On 17 August he was appointed as the secretary of the assembly.> Montmorency fought the aristocracy under the tutelage of the abbé Sieyès. He moved the abolition of armorial bearings on 19 June 1790. Before 20 April 1792 he and Count de Narbonne, the Minister of War, went to inspect the troops. Around the Storming of the Tuileries in August Montmorency fled to Coppet to live with Mme de Staël and Arnail François, marquis de Jaucourt. In January 1793 he accompanied her to Boulogne-sur-mer, when she sought refuge in England. On 17 June 1794 his brother an abott was guillotined.{{sfn|Biographie des hommes vivants|1818}} Montmorency started to study the church father Augustine.  In May 1795 he lived in Yverdon. He returned to Paris to see his relatives. He was arrested as an émigré on the 26th of December, but released after a few days. Montmorency lived on an estate in Ormesson-sur-Marne. De Staël and Constant joined him there and Montmorency visited them 1797 in Luzarches.

In 1803 he again joined the Coppet group; he accompanied her to Paris. In August 1811 he traveled with De Staël in Switzerland.  François-Emmanuel Guignard, De Montmorency, Mme Récamier were exiled by Napoleon. At the beginning of the Bourbon Restoration, he was promoted to the rank of maréchal de camp, but in March 1815 (at beginning of the Hundred Days) he accompanied Marie Thérèse of France from Bordeaux to London and met with Louis XVIII in Ghent who was forced to flee. After the Battle of Waterloo and the final defeat of Napoleon, he was made a peer of France and received the title of Vicomte de Montmorency-Laval. He was instrumental in convincing Armand-Emmanuel du Plessis, Duc de Richelieu to replace his former friend and former Bonapartist Charles Maurice de Talleyrand-Périgord as the new Prime Minister of France.

Known for strong reactionary, ultramontane, and Ultra-royalist views, Felicite became the French minister of foreign affairs under Jean-Baptiste Guillaume Joseph, comte de Villèle in December 1821. He recommended armed intervention in Spain, to restore Ferdinand VII, at the Congress of Verona in October 1822. However, he resigned his post in December, being compensated by the title of Duc de Montmorency-Laval and the cross of the Legion of Honour soon after.

Death
He was elected to the Académie française in 1825, with few qualifications for the honour. The following year, he was named tutor to the six-year-old heir to the throne, the Duc de Bordeaux. He died two months after receiving this prestigious appointment, on 24 March 1826. He was discovered seated lifeless at the end of the Good Friday Liturgy in St. Thomas d'Aquin church in the fashionable St. Germain des Près faubourg. After the death of her husband, Mathieu de Montmorency became the legal guardian of De Staël's children. Like August Schlegel he was one of her intimates until the end of her life.

References

References

Attribution:
 Endnotes:
 M. Vétillard, Notice sur la vie de M. le duc Mathieu de Montmorency (Le Mans, 1826)
 P. Gautier, Mathieu de Montmorency et Mme de Staël, d'après les lettres inédites de M. de Montmorency à Mme Necker de Saussure'' (1908), for his curious relations with Mme de Staël
 Madame de Boigne (Adélaïde d'Osmond) Mémoires: Récits d'une tante, Mercure de France, t.2

Further reading

1767 births
1826 deaths
Mathieu
Politicians from Paris
French counter-revolutionaries
Burials at Picpus Cemetery
People of the French Revolution
People of the Ancien Régime
People of the Bourbon Restoration
French Ultra-royalists
19th-century French diplomats
People of the First French Empire
Dukes of Montmorency
Coppet group
Peers of France
Members of the Académie Française
French Foreign Ministers